Sameera may refer to:

Sameera (film), a 1981 Hindi film 
Sameera (given name), or Samira, including a list of people with the name
Nuwan Sameera (born 1985), Sri Lankan cricketer

See also

Sameer (disambiguation)
Samir, a male name